C. R. Vijayakumari is an Indian actress in the Tamil film industry from 1953 to 2003.

Film career
Vijayakumari is known for her ability to convincingly transform herself into the characters she portrays.   She is noted for her Tamil diction and dialog delivery. Her acting credits in films include Kumudam, Saradha, Kumgumam, Santhi, Aanandhi, Avan Pithan, Alli, Thedi vantha thirumagal, Pachai Vilakku, Naanum oru penn, Paar Magale Paar, Kaakkum Karangal, Policekãran Magal, Kodimalar and Aalayamani. One of her best performances is as Kannagi in the movie Poompuhar. The film, written by M. Karunanidhi, features the longest dialogue spoken by a female actor till today.

Personal life
She had a 12-year relationship with actor S. S. Rajendran from 1961 to 1973. The couple have a son Ravikumar born in 1963. Later she legally married National Mudaliar a diamond business man .

Filmography

References

External links

Living people
Indian film actresses
Actresses in Tamil cinema
Place of birth missing (living people)
20th-century Indian actresses
21st-century Indian actresses
1936 births